Molnaszecsőd is a village in Vas county, Hungary.The population in 2011 are 229 and 203,males and female respectively.

References

Populated places in Vas County